Kumbalgodu (also spelled as Kumbalagodu) is a town located on the outskirts of the Indian city of Bangalore. It is situated along the Mysore Road between Kengeri and Bidadi, and, according to the 2011 census, has a population of over 10,000.

The Bangalore Swaminarayan Gurukul International School is located in Kumbalgodu.

References 

Cities and towns in Bangalore Urban district